The Coroners' Society of England and Wales is the representative body for coroners in England and Wales.

The organisation was formed in 1846 and held its inaugural meeting on 4 February of that year.

References

External links
Official website.

1846 in England
1846 establishments in England
Law of the United Kingdom
British coroners